Kindred Group  (formerly Unibet Group Plc) is an online gambling operator which consists of nine brands, among them Unibet, Maria Casino and 32Red. The Group offer products such as online casino, online poker, online bingo, and sports betting. The company is registered in Malta, but also has major hub offices in Gibraltar, London, Stockholm and the US in addition to smaller satellite offices across Europe and Australia. Kindred Group is a publicly listed company on the Stockholm Stock Exchange (Nasdaq). In 2017, the company's revenue was GBP 751.4 million.

History 
In 2011 Unibet was awarded one of 48 licenses for the newly re-regulated Danish market.

In 2012 Unibet acquired Bet24, a Danish online bookmaker.

On 3 December 2013 Unibet announced that it was moving its poker operation away from the MPN network to offer a standalone poker site. In April 2014 Unibet signed a deal with Thunderkick, making them one of the first brands to support Thunderkick games.

On 19 May 2014, shareholders of Unibet approved the proposed spin-off of its B2B subsidiary Kambi Group Plc. The company's 95 per cent stake in the business was subsequently distributed to Unibet shareholders. The Kambi Group Plc share started trading on the NASDAQ OMX Stockholm First North on 2 June 2014. The share closed at SEK 34 on the first day of trading, giving the company a market valuation of SEK 1,011,200,700.

Unibet purchased Bingo.com Ltd.’s www.bingo.com domain and its real money online gambling business for a total of $8 million effective 31 December 2014. Unibet paid $2 million in cash and the remaining balance was paid with the redemption of its 15,000,000 in common shares in Bingo.com at $0.40 per share.

On 14 November 2016, Unibet announced a partnership with Swedish electronic identification service, BankID, as the first gambling operator to utilise the bank developed solution at its Unibet and Maria Casino brands.

Unibet continued on their acquisition trail in July 2015 with the purchase of StanJames.com (online business). The price paid was believed to be £19 million in cash, adjusted for any customer liabilities. The deal did not include any of the Stan James high street retail shops, which have been rebranded as Megabet.

In December 2016, shareholders at Unibet agreed to change the name of the business to Kindred Group Plc. The change was supposedly "due to the company's focus on developing a multi-brand strategy moving forward".

The newly named Kindred Group Plc continued their acquisition strategy in February 2017, snapping up the Gibraltar-based online gaming business 32Red Plc.  

In April 2018, Kindred Group launched an online gambling ad blocker tool so customers who choose to exclude themselves will be safe from gambling advertisements.

In August 2018, Kindred Group announced a partnership with the Hard Rock Hotel & Casino Atlantic City, marking the company's first entrance to the United States sports betting market by entering the New Jersey sports betting market. On January 28, 2019, Kindred Group formed a partnership with the Mohegan Sun Pocono casino near Wilkes-Barre, Pennsylvania to enter the Pennsylvania sports betting market.

References

External links
 Kindred Group website

Online gambling companies of Sweden
Gambling companies established in 1997
Online poker companies
Online gambling companies of Malta
Companies listed on Nasdaq Stockholm